The 1986–87 ACB season was the 4th season of the ACB Primera División, the top Spanish professional basketball league. It started on 13 September 1986 with the first round of the regular season and ended on 25 April 1987 with the finals.

FC Barcelona won their first ACB title, and their fourth Spanish title.

Format changes
Starting from this season, the promotions and relegations teams at the end of the season between ACB Primera División and Primera División B were reduced from three to two teams. For the championship playoffs, the semifinals and finals adopted the best-of-five playoff, instead of previous season's best-of-three playoff that were kept for the first round and quarterfinals. For the relegation playoffs, were reduced from two to one round and adopted the best-of-five playoff.

Teams

Promotion and relegation (pre-season)
A total of 16 teams contested the league, including 13 sides from the 1985–86 season and three promoted from the 1985–86 Primera División B.

Teams promoted from Primera División B
Cajacanarias
Cajabilbao
Oximesa Granada

Venues and locations

First phase

Group Odd

Group Even

Second phase

Group A1

Group A2

Playoffs

Championship playoffs

Source: Linguasport

Relegation playoffs

|}
Source: Linguasport

Final standings

External links
 Official website 
 Linguasport 

 
Spanish
Liga ACB seasons